Émile Paganon (July 19, 1916 – January 24, 2012) was a French military officer of the chasseurs alpins and skier. He was leader of the national Olympic military patrol team in 1948 which placed fifth.

Paganon was born in Thônes. He was married to Herminie with one son. The family lived in the French district Vercors, when he served as a ski reconnaissance platoon leader in the 6th Bataillon de chasseurs alpins in Gresse from 1941 to 1943 during World War II. In January 1943 their only son died. In the following years he was Lieutenant in the 3rd/7th Bataillon de chasseurs alpins in Savoy. For his merits in the battle of the Little St Bernard Pass he was awarded with the Bronze Star Medal by Montgomery.

He died at the age of 95 years in Bourg-Saint-Maurice.

Bibliography 
 Ulysse Bozonnet: Section Paganon. "Dans les cimes pour la liberté". L'esprit de résistance, de fraternité et de compétition. Chroniques des années 1930-1948, 2005.

External links 
 Captain Paganon, photo from 1960

References 

1916 births
2012 deaths
French military patrol (sport) runners
Military patrol competitors at the 1948 Winter Olympics
Olympic biathletes of France
Sportspeople from Haute-Savoie
French military personnel of World War II